WBMX (104.3 FM, 104.3 Jams) is a commercial radio station in Chicago, Illinois, serving the Chicago metropolitan area and Northwest Indiana. The station is owned by Audacy, Inc. and airs a classic hip hop radio format.

WBMX's studios and offices are located at Two Prudential Plaza in the Chicago Loop.  The station has an effective radiated power (ERP) of 4,100 watts, with its transmitter atop the Willis Tower (formerly Sears Tower).  WBMX broadcasts in the HD Radio format, with its HD2 signal simulcasting the sports radio format on co-owned WSCR.

From 1974 to 1988, the call letters WBMX were held by 102.7 FM, licensed to Oak Park, Illinois (now Urban AC station WVAZ). On December 4, 2017, the call letters were transferred from Boston to 104.3 FM in Chicago.

History

WSEL
The station began broadcasting in September 1953, holding the call sign WSEL. It aired beautiful music, light classical music, recorded music and show tunes along with news reports. The station had an ERP of 40,000 watts, and its transmitter was located atop Chicago's Randolph Tower. WSEL was owned by Chicago Skyway Broadcasting Company.

A previous station in Chicago had briefly operated on 104.3 MHz in 1949. WCFL-FM, owned by the Chicago Federation of Labor, broadcast from 3 to 9 p.m. as a 400-watt simulcast of WCFL, but the owners surrendered the station's license, as it was not profitable.

In 1958, WSEL's transmitter was moved to the Willoughby Tower at 8 South Michigan Avenue. In 1960, the station was sold to Plough Broadcasting for $50,000, and it was taken silent.

WJJD-FM
The station returned to the air January 2, 1961, with its call sign changed to WJJD-FM. It was co-owned with 1160 WJJD by Plough Broadcasting. At the time, 1160 WJJD was a daytimer. WJJD-FM initially aired classical music, show tunes, folk music, and jazz.

On February 15, 1965, WJJD adopted a country music format, and WJJD-FM simulcast 1160 WJJD, with WJJD-FM continuing WJJD's country programming after sunset.

In 1971, the station's transmitter was moved to the Prudential Building, and its ERP was reduced to 14,100 watts.

WJEZ
In February 1977, the station's call sign was changed to WJEZ'. The station adopted a "beautiful country" format, playing easy listening country music, with large amount of instrumentals, in an approach patterned on the beautiful music format.

In September 1978, the station adopted a "modern country" format, with a playlist that was approximately 80% country, 20% adult contemporary. The station was branded "Z-104". In 1982, WJEZ gained competition as WUSN also adopted a country format. At that point, WJJD 1160 adopted an adult standards format, known as "The Music Of Your Life". In 1984, Infinity Broadcasting acquired WJEZ and WJJD for $13.5 million.

Oldies era

In early August 1984, the station adopted an oldies format as "Magic 104" and its call sign was changed to WJMK. Dick Biondi was the first disc jockey heard on "Magic 104". Ron Britain was also one of WJMK's original DJs. Initially, "Magic 104" included a few currents in its playlist, but by early 1985, all songs from the current decade were dropped, with the station playing music from the 1950s, 1960s, and early 1970s.

In 1987, the station's transmitter was moved to the Sears Tower, and its ERP was reduced to 4,100 watts.

In 1991, the station's moniker was changed to "Oldies 104.3". In early September 1993, John Records Landecker joined WJMK as morning drive DJ, remaining with the station until 2003.

In 1996, Infinity Broadcasting was purchased by the parent company of CBS.

In 1999, with competition from the new Jammin' Oldies format of WUBT, WJMK increased the number of 1970s songs playing 3 to 4 per hour on the station while reducing the number of pre-1964 songs played to about 3 per hour while the 50's songs were cut to 2 per hour. The station added several dozen 80's songs playing about 1 every 2 hours. By 2002, the station would replace the All Request Saturday Night oldies show with a 1970s and early 80s program.

On February 15, 2002, WJMK returned to its former moniker, "Magic 104.3", and its playlist was shifted to include more 1980s music, while further reducing the music played from the '50s and early '60s. In July 2003, the station once again changed monikers, going back to "Oldies 104.3" and its playlist was refocused on music of the '60s and '70s. In 2004, the station dropped the "Oldies" moniker and became known simply as "104.3 WJMK" with the slogan "The Greatest Hits of the 60s and 70s".

Jack FM
On June 3, 2005, at 4 p.m., WJMK switched to an adult hits format known as "Jack FM" at the same time veteran oldies station WCBS-FM in New York City made the same switch. The station had a 1980s centric playlist, along with some titles from the 1960s, 1970s, 1990s, and 2000s. It usually had no live DJs and instead used sarcastic remarks voiced by Howard Cogan during breaks.

Though WJMK's previous oldies format continued to be streamed online and on the WJMK's second HD Radio subchannel, complaints about WJMK's switch were numerous. In July 2006, in a cost-cutting move by CBS Radio, the entire DJ staff of WJMK-HD2 was laid off. Shortly thereafter, 94.7 WZZN, which had recently switched to an oldies format, hired several of WJMK's former airstaff.

With a format change on WCKG from hot talk to adult contemporary, Steve Dahl and Buzz Kilman moved to WJMK to host mornings on November 5, 2007. Dahl was dismissed on December 5, 2008. With the exception of Dahl and Kilman, Chicago's Jack FM had no live personalities.

WJMK's ratings plummeted after the switch to Jack FM, and the station saw further ratings erosion when Bonneville International debuted "Rewind 100.3" (a mostly 1980s-based format) on rival WILV in June 2010.

K-Hits
On March 10, 2011, CBS Radio announced the station would return to their previous classic hits format as "104.3 K-Hits", setting the time of relaunch for the following Monday, the 14th, at 1:04 p.m.; at 12:30 that afternoon, after playing "Goodbye to You" by Scandal,  the station began stunting with a montage of songs and pop culture clips from 1966 to 1989, and at the promised time,  "K-Hits" was launched with "Beginnings" by, fittingly, Chicago.

Chicago radio personalities Ed Volkman and Joe "Bohannon" Colborn (Eddie and JoBo) hosted the station's morning show, along with Gary Spears in middays, Bo Reynolds in afternoon drive time and George McFly heard in the evening. Weekend hosts included Tommy Edwards, Ken Cocker, and John Calhoun.

Eddie and JoBo were released on December 6, 2012, with the station citing low ratings as the main factor. Mornings were then hosted by Dave Fogel, formerly of WLS-FM. Tommy Edwards retired from radio on September 12, 2014. The rest of the station's final airstaff included Brian Peck in middays and Jeffrey T. Mason in afternoon drive.

In its last year, WJMK primarily played music from the 1970s and 1980s.

104.3 Jams
On February 2, 2017, CBS Radio announced it would merge with Entercom. The merger was approved on November 9, 2017, and was consummated on November 17.

On November 17, at 10 a.m., after playing "The Long and Winding Road" by The Beatles and "Changes" by David Bowie, WJMK began stunting with sound effects and clips of a man giving occasional comments, such as "What's going on here?" and "It's almost time to start." One hour later, WJMK flipped to classic hip-hop, branded as "104.3 Jams", which began with an introduction by legendary rapper, actress, radio DJ, and station voice MC Lyte. The first song on "Jams" was "Hypnotize" by The Notorious B.I.G.

Entercom applied to move the WBMX call sign to 104.3 from its sister station in Boston to match the new format; the change took effect on December 4, 2017. The WBMX call letters had previously been used by new rival WVAZ from 1974 to 1988. In addition to WVAZ, WBMX also competes with WPWX and WGCI in the urban radio market.

WBMX is the second station in Chicago to use the "Jams" moniker, the first station being WEJM in the mid-1990s.

References

External links 
 

Radio stations established in 1953
1953 establishments in Illinois
BMX
Classic hip hop radio stations in the United States
Audacy, Inc. radio stations